A clot is the final product of the blood coagulation step in hemostasis.

Clot may also refer to:

Blood Clot Boy, a figure in Native American folklore
Clot (Barcelona Metro), a Barcelona Metro station
El Clot-Aragó, the adjacent railway station
Clotted cream
In the United Kingdom, South Africa, and many other English-speaking countries, a foolish person

People with the surname
André Clot (1909–2002), French historian and essayist
Antoine Clot (1793–1868), French physician
Auguste Clot (1858–1936), French art printer